Jon Ola Sand (born 21 December 1961) is a Norwegian television executive. He was the European Broadcasting Union's Executive Supervisor of the Eurovision Song Contest from 2011 to 2020.

Personal life
He is the son of revue writer and actor Bjørn Sand and actress Unni Bernhoft. He grew up at Vinderen in Oslo, and has a brother and a sister. His brother, is an actor and author.

As of May 2010, Sand was in a cohabiting relationship with the Swedish choreographer Mattias Carlsson. Sand lives in Geneva, Switzerland.

In October 2010, Sand was a passenger on the train that derailed at Skotterud in Hedmark, Norway. The incident resulted in some 40 people being injured.

Career
Sand appeared in a minor role in the 1980 film At dere tør!, having graduated the same year from the music branch of his local upper secondary school. As a teenager he played the drums in a hard rock band, which eventually led him being hired by NRK, the Norwegian Broadcasting Corporation as a researcher for a music TV programme. He started his television career in NRK in 1981, and advanced via programme secretary to producer and project leader, eventually leading major productions and co-productions at NRK. He had a stint in the competing channel TV 2 from 1992 to 1996. Sand is a member of the International Academy of Television Arts and Sciences.

Television shows produced or directed by Sand include the Nobel Peace Prize Concert, the Amanda Award show and Melodi Grand Prix.

Eurovision Song Contest

From 1998 to 2005, he headed the Norwegian delegation at the Eurovision Song Contest. In 2010, Sand was appointed as the Executive Producer of the Eurovision Song Contest 2010, held in Oslo, Norway. Sand is a television producer for the Norwegian television channel NRK, which was responsible for holding the festival in 2010, when Sand was the chief of production for the event.

On 26 November 2010, Sand was appointed as the European Broadcasting Union's Executive Supervisor of the Eurovision Song Contest, after Svante Stockselius resigned from the role, the new position began on 1 January 2011. Sand reportedly edged out 39 other applicants. As Executive Supervisor, Sand has the last call with regards to the production of the Eurovision Song Contest, with the ability to overrule the producers, and instruct. He is also responsible for the organization of the voting system of the contest. He made his debut as Executive Supervisor at the 2011 contest in Düsseldorf. Sand was later appointed as the Executive Supervisor for the Junior Eurovision Song Contest 2016. He had been on leave from NRK since being appointed Executive Supervisor.

In an interview with the news agency Reuters in 2011, Sand launched the idea of extending the Eurovision Song Contest to a potential Worldvision Song Contest. In May 2015, Sand stated to the Norwegian public broadcaster NRK that the Worldvision idea was likely not moving forward, due to a lack of interest among countries outside Europe. He also cited the large cost of a worldwide song contest. In a 2016 interview with The Guardian he stated, "We are not looking at a sort of ‘Worldvision’ because that's too complicated (...)". Sand stated to Danish media in 2016 that the European Broadcasting Union was instead developing plans to export the Eurovision concept by launching separate versions of the song contest in Asia and the United States, depending on the level of interest in the relevant countries. He was featured in the newspaper Morgenbladet in May 2012, where the focus was on the song contest and international politics.

On 30 September 2019, Sand announced his intention to step down as Executive Supervisor of the Eurovision Song Contest after the 2020 edition, that would have been be held in Rotterdam, the Netherlands (which was later cancelled due to the COVID-19 pandemic). He would also leave the Head of Live Events post which oversees the Junior Eurovision Song Contest, Eurovision Young Musicians and Eurovision Choir competitions. On 20 January 2020, it was announced that Swedish TV producer Martin Österdahl would succeed Sand as Executive Supervisor.

On 17 May 2020, Sand was officially succeeded by Österdahl as Executive Supervisor of the Eurovision Song Contest after the one-off replacement show Eurovision: Europe Shine a Light was aired. He then returned to NRK, serving as project leader of its head office's relocation.

References

External links 

1961 births
Living people
Television people from Oslo
Norwegian male film actors
NRK people
TV 2 (Norway) people
Norwegian television executives
Melodi Grand Prix
Eurovision Song Contest people
Norwegian LGBT people
Norwegian expatriates in Switzerland
People from Geneva